Queenzy Cheng (born 26 February 1986) is a Malaysian actress and singer. She briefly used the stage name Queenz adapting the American way of pronouncing Z (also pronouns as /kwiːn’zi/).

Biography 
Queenzy's musical career began when she was five, performing solo in her relative's wedding reception. She gradually transformed into an artiste, launching her debut at the age of eight. Famous for releasing Chinese New Year albums over the last two decades, Queenzy also performs across other genres from classical music to musical theatre and pop. To date, M-Girls have released more than 17 albums.

Following her success of her albums, Queenzy collectively formed M-Girls 四个女生 in 2001 with three other emerging artistes; Angeline Khoo, Cass Chin and Crystal Ong. The M-Girls' debut album and subsequent releases won multiple awards. M-Girls was quickly dubbed the S.H.E of Malaysia. Their albums were not only the fastest-selling album in the Malaysian Chinese New Year album history but also in the Asian region.

In 2017, Queenzy collaborated with Taiwanese model, Tom Chang (張瀚元) to release a single titled 愛 "Don't Be Shy". The single was recorded in Kuala Lumpur, Malaysia, and filmed in Taipei, Taiwan. On 9 October 2017, Queenzy announced on her Facebook page that she would be releasing her 2018 Chinese New Year album in her personal capacity since M-Girls were taking a break. She has also invited her fans to participate by submitting their lyrics to be part of that year's album. Queenzy revealed that she was releasing the 2018 You Are The Best! album with guest celebrities including Wei Wei ⼩薇薇, John Wee 黄俊源 and Tedd Chan 曾国辉 on 15 November 2017.

In 2018, Queenzy collaborated with Crystal Ong to reproduce an online single similar to their 1995 双星报喜 album. They reproduced the 招财进宝 song with almost identical costume, composition and filming method. On 15 October 2018, Queenzy announced that she would release her Queenzy and Friends album in 2019 with guest celebrities including Tedd Chan 曾国辉, Veron Lin 练倩汶 as well as PongPong碰碰 – Jeii Pong 庞捷忆 and Gaston Pong 庞圭武.

Discography

Early album (Folk / Chinese New Year)
1995. 卖馄饨 Selling Wontons (Queenzy Solo Album)
1995. 神奇电脑 Magic Computer (Queenzy Solo Album)
1995. 金童玉女 First Timers (Queenzy & Su Li Da)
1995. 双星报喜 Vol.1 Double Stars Bring Luck (Queenzy & Crystal CNY Album)
1995. 雅歌群星龙狮会 Ya-Ko Stars Lion Dance (Crystal, Queenz & Ya-Ko Stars CNY Album)
1996. 双星报喜 Vol.2 Double Stars Bring Luck (Queenzy & Crystal CNY Album)
1996. 雅歌群星贺新年 Ya-Ko Stars Celebrate the New Year (Queenzy, Crystal & Ya-Ko Stars CNY Album)
1996. 花花絮絮 Highlights (Crystal & Queenzy)
1998. 新春嘉年华 Chinese New Year Carnival (Queenzy & Chen Jia Lin CNY Album)
1998. 三星报喜 Three Stars Bring Luck (Queenzy, Winnie, Chingy 1998 CNY Album)
1999. 兔气扬眉庆丰年 Tu Qi Yang Mei Qing Feng Nian (Queenzy, Crystal, Cassandra & Ya-Ko Stars CNY Album)
1999. 山歌黄梅调 Huang Mei Diao Mountain Songs (Queenzy, Crystal, Cassandra Album)
2000. 三星拱照庆龙年 Three Stars Celebrate the Year of the Dragon (Queenzy, Crystal, Cassandra CNY Album)
2000. 民谣 Folk Songs 2 in 1 (Queenzy, Crystal, Cassandra Album)

Pop albums
2001. Dance With Me (2001)
2003. 耍花样 Playful Tricks
2004. 笨金鱼 Silly Goldfish
2004. 爱情密码 Love Code (MV collection)
2005. 尼罗河 Nile River
2013/14. My Way
2017. 愛 Don't Be Shy

Chinese New Year albums
2001. 開心迎接豐收年 Happily Welcoming the Harvest Year
2002. 飛跃新年 Leaping New Year
2003. 新年YEAH! New Year YEAH!
2004. 春风催花开 Flowers Blossom in the Spring
2005. 开心年 Happy Year
2006. 同庆共乐 Celebrate Together
2007. 世外桃源 Paradise
2007. 八大巨星 好日子 Eight Superstars Good Day
2008. 福禄寿星拱照·花仙子 Fu Lu Shou Xing Gong Zhao. Flower Fairy
2009. 桃花开了 Flowers Blossoms
2010. 金玉满堂 Abundant Wealth
2012. 年味 The Fragrance of Chinese New Year
2013. 团聚 Reunion
2014. 真欢喜 True Joy2015. 新春佳期 New Spring Holiday2016. 年来了 Chinese New Year is Coming2017. 过年要红红 Reddish Chinese New Year2018. 今年你最好 You Are The Best!2019. 双星报喜 招财进宝 Double Stars Bring Luck - Lucky Fortune (Queenzy & Crystal CNY Single)
2019. 春天的愿望 Spring Wishes2020. 春风笑了 Joyous Spring Breeze2021. 牛起来 Happy Niu Year2022. 好好好 Good, Better, Best!2023. 兔年回家快乐 Happy Homecoming Filmography Bad Students? 3 最烂学生?3 (2015)This Moment of Yesterday 我愿时光倒流 (2015)Imprisonment 囚 (2013)Fairy Tales of the Sky 童话的天空Island Story 小岛物语Do not say love is bitter 别说爱情苦Kung Hei Fat Choy mother 恭喜发财婆婆Tiger celebrate love each other. 相亲相爱庆虎年Golden Tiger Annunciation 金虎报喜Matrimony 心中有鬼Mind Game 心迷 (2014)The Precedents 法内情 (2015)On The Brink 重案狙击 (2014)On The Brink 2 重案狙击2 (2015)The Pulse of Life 脉动人心 (2015)Alice in the Wonderland 爱丽丝历险记 (2016)Astro Hua Hee Everyday Season 7, 8 & 9 欢喜欢喜就好 (2016)I Court You'' 师出名门 (2020)

References

External links
Official Website

1986 births
Malaysian actresses
Malaysian people of Hokkien descent
Malaysian people of Chinese descent
People from Perlis
21st-century Malaysian women singers
Living people
20th-century Malaysian women singers